Tujhse Hai Raabta ( My heart knows) is an Indian Hindi-language television series that airs on Zee TV and is digitally available on ZEE5. It replaced Piyaa Albela . It premiered on 3 September 2018 and focuses on the unspoken connections and bonds between people. It stars Reem Shaikh, Sehban Azim, Poorva Gokhale, Arzaan Shaikh and Rajat Dahiya.

It was replaced by Bhagya Lakshmi in its timeslot.

Plot

Kalyani Deshmukh lives in Pune with her parents. Her mother Madhuri slips on the balcony and dies, and her father Atul is jailed and gives her custody to his caring ex-wife, Anupriya who is dominated by her family. Kalyani's cousin, Sampada loves Atharv but was forced to marry ACP Malhar Rane. She delivers a son, named Moksh and elopes with Atharv. Malhar marries and troubles Kalyani, believing she was behind Sampada and Atharv's elopement.

Kalyani raises Moksh. Atharv and Sampada live poorly. He marries the landlady, Mugdha, proclaiming she is mentally unstable and takes over her property. Atharv and Sampada try to create problems for Kalyani but fail. Anupriya's brother, Keshav takes revenge on her by kidnapping Moksh, but Malhar finds him. After learning his mother Kavita died due to an accident by Atul's father Sayajirao, Malhar is angry. Sayajirao kills himself. Atul returns from jail.

Malhar and Kalyani reacquire Moksh's custody from Sampada. Atharv turns mentally unstable due to an accident. He befriends a man, in fact Malhar's father, Madhav. Kalyani introduces him to Malhar. A dead body is found. Madhav's brother, Sarthak reveals he killed the man. Malhar's sister, Swara tells the man was Radheshyam, a transgender man whom she fell in love with and married him. Kalyani realizes Sarthak isn't responsible for Radheshyam's death.

Soon, it turns out Malhar's half-brother, Aahir killed Radhe Shyam. He kidnaps Moksh but is jailed after Malhar and Kalyani save Moksh. Her friend Rachit enters. In a taxi, Malhar realises the driver is Aahir and saves Kalyani. Aahir escapes. Kalyani meets Madhuri's twin sister Mamta, who lost her right hand and works for the Naxals. Rachit reveals he loves Kalyani. Diagnosed with cancer, Moksh needs an urgent bone marrow transplant.

Rachit tries to molest and later kill Kalyani, but Malhar saves her. Atharv, disguised, kidnaps Atul's mother Ahilya and tries to kill the child. Kalyani faints. Malhar learns her health is deteriorating, and abortion is necessary. Kalyani sends Divya in car. The car explodes, and she dies. Kalyani and Malhar realise Moksh was also in it and assume him dead. Kalyani blames Malhar who shoots her, and she is presumed dead.

5 years later

Malhar is now Sub-Inspector and lives in guilt for having lost Kalyani. Kalyani is now District Magistrate of the area. Swara is married to Vivek. Anupriya no longer considers Kalyani as her daughter. During her engagement to Minister Damini Deshpande's son, Vikram, Kalyani is caught in a fire, and Malhar saves her. Vikram rejects Kalyani after seeing her face. But Kalyani removes her bandages, thus revealing that she has only minor burns. But Kalyani refuses to marry Vikram due to his attitude.

On Avni's baby shower, it is revealed that Avni is not Malhar's wife. Ahir had left Avni when she became pregnant with his child. Madhav's dying wish was that Malhar would take care of Avni and her child in his name. Meanwhile, Kalyani finds out that Mukku is none other than Moksh. Moksh accidentally kills Ahir. Kalyani hides Moksh from Malhar, fearing that if Malhar finds Moksh, he will send him to the correction home. Meanwhile, Vivek accidentally burns Swara and is arrested.

To save Vivek from Sarthak's wrath, Anupriya tells him that Mukku is her and Sarthak's daughter. Avni tries to separate the family and turn them against each other fortunately Malhar discovers that Mukku is his son Moksh and is elated but Sarthak becomes depressed and the case of Ahir's death is opened and Malhar, Kalyani and Anupriya try to save Moksh but Malhar is shot by Avni and Anupriya is blamed and Moksh becomes mute as he is the witness to the incident of Malhar's death. Malhar returns and Moksh reveals that Anupriya is innocent and Avni had shot Malhar so Anupriya is proved innocent. Anupriya and Sarthak reunite with their lost daughter, Gungun and get remarried. Finally, Malhar, Kalyani, Moksh, Anupriya and Sarthak reunite to live happily.

Cast

Main
 Reem Shaikh as Kalyani Deshmukh Rane: DM officer; Atul and Madhuri's  daughter; Anupriya's adoptive daughter; Sampada, Godavari and Nal's cousin; Malhar's wife; Moksh's adoptive mother (2018–2021)
 Sehban Azim as Malhar Rane: Sub-Inspector, ACP or Commissioner; Kavita and Madhav's son; Swara's brother; Aahir's half-brother; Sampada's ex-husband; Kalyani's husband; Moksh's father (2018–2021)
 Poorva Gokhale as Anupriya Bindal Rane: Advocate; Keshav's sister; Atul's ex-wife; Kalyani's adoptive mother; Sarthak's wife; Gungun's mother; Moksh's adopti e grandmother  (2018–2021)
 Rajat Dahiya as Sarthak Rane: Advocate; Madhav's brother; Anupriya's second husband; Riddhi's adoptive father; Gungun's father (2019–2021)
 Mahi Soni as Moksh Rane: Sampada and Malhar's son; Kalyani adoptive son (2020–2021)
 Arzaan Shaikh as Baby Moksh (2018–2020)
 Purvi Mishra as Gungun Rane: Anupriya and Sarthak's daughter; Malhar, Swara and Aahir's cousin (2021)

Recurring
 Savita Prabhune as Ahilya Deshmukh: Sayajirao's widow; Atul, Aparna and Vivek's mother; Sampada, Kalyani, Godavari and Nal's grandmother (2018–2021)
 Shagun Pandey / Varun Sharma as Atharv Bapat: Pallavi's brother; Swara, Sampada and Mugdha's ex-husband (2018–2021)
Sneha Shah as Sampada Verma: Aparna and Vaman's daughter; Malhar and Atharv's ex-wife; Moksh's mother (2018–2021)
 Shahab Khan as Sayajirao Deshmukh: Ahilya's husband; Atul, Aparna and Vivek's father; Sampada, Kalyani, Godavari and Nal's grandfather (2018–2019) (Dead)
 Priya Shinde as Pallavi Bapat: Atharv's sister; Vivek's ex-wife; Godavari and Nal's mother (2018–2020)
 Rajeshwari Datta as Aparna Deshmukh Verma: Ahilya and Sayajirao's daughter; Atul and Vivek's sister; Vaman's wife; Sampada's mother; Moksh's grandmother (2018–2021)
 Pankaj Vishnu as Atul Deshmukh: Ahilya and Sayajirao's son; Aparna and Vivek's brother; Anupriya's ex-husband; Madhuri's widower; Kalyani's father (2018–2019) (Dead)
 Amrapali Gupta as 
 Madhuri Verma: Vaman and Mamta's sister; Atul's second wife; Kalyani's mother (2018) (Dead)
 Mamta Verma: Madhuri and Vaman's sister (2019–2020)
 Bharat Arora as Vaman Verma: Madhuri and Mamta's brother; Aparna's husband; Sampada's father; Moksh's grandfather (2019)
 Preetika Chauhan as C.P. Meenakshi Parmarth Borkar (2021)
 Anuj Khurana as Vivek Deshmukh: Ahilya and Sayajirao's son; Atul and Aparna's brother; Pallavi's ex-husband; Swara's husband; Godavari and Nal's father (2018–2020)
 Anju Jadhav as Swara Rane Deshmukh: Kavita and Madhav's daughter; Malhar's sister; Atharv's ex-wife; Vivek's wife (2019–2020)
Ekta Methai as Godavari Deshmukh Mehrotra: Pallavi and Vivek's daughter; Nal's sister; Sampada and Kalyani's cousin; Ajinkya's wife (2020–2021)
 Ayush Anand as Trilok Marathe (2020)
 Snehal Waghmare as Inspector Divya Marathe (2020)
 Ananya Dwivedi as Suhana Marathe (2020)
 Shrashti Maheshwari as Avni Dixit (2020–2021)
 Utkarsh Gupta as Rachit Khanna: Kalyani's friend (2019–2020)
 Milind Pathak as Madhav Rane: Sarthak's brother; Kavita and Asawari's husband; Malhar, Swara and Aahir's father; Moksh's grandfather (2019–2020)
 Amita Choksi as Asawari Rane: Madhav's second wife; Aahir's mother (2019–2021)
 Asma Badar as Mugdha Bapat: Atharv's ex-wife (2019)
 Siddharth Dhanda as Aahir Rane: Asawari and Madhav's son; Malhar and Swara's half-brother (2019–2020)
 Vaishnavi Prajapati as Riddhi Dasgupta: Sarthak's adopted daughter (2019–2020)
 Roop Durgapal as Ketki Walia: Malhar's friend (2019)
 Pankit Thakker as Adinath Sayed (2019)
 Sheena Bajaj as Varsha Nehra: Atharv's fake girlfriend (2018)
 Amit Soni as Keshav Bindal: Anupriya's brother; Gungun's uncle (2019)
 Sanjeev Swaraj as Inspector Arvind Pawar (2018–2021)
 Zebby Singh as Inspector Abhimanyu Singh: Uttara's husband (2021)
 Vaidika Senjaliya as Uttara Singh: Abhimanyu's wife (2021)
 Twinkle Gangwar as Mihika Oberoi: Film actress (2021)
 Gourav Raj Puri as Ajinkya Mehrotra: Transgender; Akshay's twin brother; Godavari's husband (2021) / Akshay Mehrotra: Ajinkya's twin brother (2021)

Production
The production and airing of the show was halted indefinitely in late March 2020 due to the COVID-19 outbreak in India. Because of the outbreak, the filming of television series and films was halted on 19 March 2020 and expected to resume on 1 April 2020 but could not and the series was last broadcast on 24 March 2020 when the remaining episodes were aired. The filming resumed on 28 June 2020 and with airing to resume on 13 July 2020.

Reception
In April 2019, the series and the channel was sent notice by Election Commission for promoting the then Indian Prime Minister Narendra Modi's government scheme of Mudra Loan which violated the code of conduct for which the channel replied, "As a responsible national television network, ZEE has always created content basis its stringent content guidelines. The mention of certain government schemes and initiatives in some of the episodes of the television shows was a creative call taken purely in the interest of the public."

Adaptations

References

External links
 Tujhse Hai Raabta at ZEE5
 

2018 Indian television series debuts
Hindi-language television shows
Indian drama television series
Indian television soap operas
Zee TV original programming